Fraternities and sororities at the University of Virginia include the collegiate organizations on the grounds of the University of Virginia in Charlottesville, Virginia. First founded in the 1850s with the establishment of a number of fraternities, the system has since expanded to include sororities, professional organizations, service fraternities, honor fraternities, and cultural organizations. Fraternities and sororities have been significant to the history of the University of Virginia, including the founding of two national fraternities Kappa Sigma (ΚΣ) and Pi Kappa Alpha (ΠΚΑ).

Roughly 30% of the student body belongs to a social fraternity or sorority, with additional students involved in professional, service, and honor fraternities. Many of the university's fraternities and sororities are residential, meaning they own or rent a house for their members to use; many of these houses are located on Rugby Road and the surrounding streets, just north of the university. Additionally, three social fraternities hold reserved rooms on the Lawn and the Range: Kappa Sigma in Room 46 East Lawn, Trigon Engineering Society in Room 17 West Lawn, and Pi Kappa Alpha in Room 47 West Range. Reflecting UVA's tradition of student self-governance, the system is currently governed by four Greek Councils consisting of student leaders; however, it is also overseen by the Department of Fraternity and Sorority Life in the university's Office of the Dean of Students.

History
Fraternities were first founded at UVA a few decades after the school's establishment in 1819. Before this time social life at the university was fixed around debating societies; the now-defunct Patrick Henry Society, for instance, initially had a membership nearly equal to the size of the student body. In the 1850s the first fraternities began to appear and assumed a significant role in the student body's social landscape. In the following decades, the university became the birthplace of two national fraternities and saw many more fraternity chapters chartered. The twentieth century saw the system expand even more to include professional fraternities, social sororities, local fraternities, and black fraternities and sororities. Moving into the 2000s, several new social organizations were founded, and multicultural organizations began to rise to prominence.

1800s: Debating societies, secret societies, and the creation of fraternities

For several decades following the founding of the university, the major student societies on grounds were the debating societies. Several of these societies, notably the Jefferson Literary and Debating Society and the Washington Literary Society and Debating Union, are still active today. These and other debating societies that are no longer in existence, such as the Philomathean Society and the Parthenon Society, served as the primary means of student societal activity in the early days of the university.

In the decade before the Civil War, eleven fraternities established chapters at the university.  The first was Delta Kappa Epsilon, or DKE (ΔΚΕ), which was founded in 1852 as a "secret" colony and remains active to this day. Faculty were originally against the creation of fraternities due to years of riotous behavior among the students and attacks upon faculty. According to University historian Philip Alexander Bruce, the faculty feared the "orderly spirit of the student body acting as a whole or in segments, whether organized into secret fraternities or into Calathumpian bands." Despite these objections, however, a chapter of DKE was founded, and other fraternities followed. It can be said generally about the early UVA fraternities that the only "secret" aspect of them was their operation and meeting location; the membership was not kept secret. As is the case with most modern fraternities, the original fraternities on grounds were meant to provide social engagement and promote close ties between members.

Fraternity growth was interrupted by the Civil War, as men from many Southern colleges halted their studies to join the Confederate army. Many fraternity chapters ceased to exist during this time, but some students made efforts to preserve their fraternities as the war continued. Harry St. John Dixon, a member of Sigma Chi from the University of Virginia, joined with four other Sigma Chi brothers from other universities to form the Constantine chapter of the fraternity. Created in 1864, this chapter was meant to preserve the bonds of the fraternity during the war, promote ties between the North and South, and ensure the fraternity's continued existence.

The expansion of fraternity life resumed after the war; by 1892 there were eighteen fraternities on grounds. Fraternities began to share the social spotlight with ribbon societies at the university, which were founded in reaction to the fraternities' social exclusivity.  The ribbon societies, such as Eli Banana and T.I.L.K.A., were originally meant to increase social involvement among students, but eventually took on a political role in the university as well.  They became particularly prestigious, mainly pulling their membership from fraternities, and election to their societies was considered a high honor. Despite this social competition, fraternities continued to grow at the university.

1868: Founding of Pi Kappa Alpha fraternity

Pi Kappa Alpha was founded on Sunday evening March 1, 1868, at 47 West Range at the University of Virginia, by Robertson Howard, Julian Edward Wood, James Benjamin Sclater Jr., Frederick Southgate Taylor, Littleton Waller Tazewell Bradford and William Alexander. On March 1, 1869, exactly one year after the Alpha chapter at the University of Virginia was formed, the Beta chapter of Pi Kappa Alpha was founded at Davidson College. Expanding the fraternity proved difficult because the Civil War disorganized many Southern colleges, and many colleges banned the formation of secret societies. After almost a decade of decline, Pi Kappa Alpha was "re-founded" as part of the Hampden-Sydney Convention, held in a dorm room at Hampden–Sydney College. Pi Kappa Alpha was not originally organized as a sectional fraternity; however, by constitutional provision it became so in 1889. It remained a Southern fraternity until the New Orleans Convention in 1909 when Pi Kappa Alpha officially declared itself a national organization. Originally, Pi Kappa Alpha's membership was restricted to white men, but the race restriction was removed in 1964.

1869: Founding of Kappa Sigma fraternity

On December 10, 1869, five students at the University of Virginia met in 46 East Lawn and founded the Kappa Sigma fraternity. William Grigsby McCormick, George Miles Arnold, John Covert Boyd, Edmund Law Rogers, Jr., and Frank Courtney Nicodemus established the fraternity based on the traditions of the Kirjath Sepher, an ancient order at the University of Bologna in the Middle Ages. These five founders became collectively known as the "Five Friends and Brothers." In 1872, Kappa Sigma initiated Stephen Alonzo Jackson, who would go on to transform the struggling local fraternity into a strong international Brotherhood. In 1873, thanks to Jackson's work, Kappa Sigma expanded to Trinity College (now Duke University), the University of Maryland, and Washington and Lee University. Since then, Kappa Sigma has become a large international fraternity with over 300 active chapters and colonies in North America.

Early 1900s: Residences, professional fraternities, and the first women's fraternities

In the beginning of the twentieth century the fraternity system continued to expand at such a rapid pace that university newspapers questioned if the increase in the number of fraternities would ever end. Many fraternity chapters were founded during this time that no longer exist at the university, such Alpha Chi Rho, Theta Nu Epsilon, and Delta Chi. Other chapters that are still active were founded at this time as well, such as Theta Chi and Phi Sigma Kappa.

Also during this time fraternities began to purchase and construct houses. During the late 1800s fraternities did not have dedicated houses; instead, they inhabited residential areas scattered around grounds, such as Dawson's Row near the Lawn and boarding houses north of the university. In 1908, the university's Board of Visitors first offered a land lease and a $12,000 loan to Kappa Sigma to construct a fraternity house, and many other fraternities followed. Most of these were located just north of the Rotunda, on Rugby Road, Madison Lane, University Place, and the surrounding streets. Some of these houses cost up to $20,000 to build, and many drew inspiration from historic UVA buildings or residences of the Old South, using elements of Jeffersonian architecture. Two houses were even styled to closely resemble famous buildings in the area, with Zeta Psi's house modeled after Monticello and Farmington, and Phi Kappa Psi's house modeled after Carr's Hill. By 1916 most fraternities had built, purchased, or rented a house for their members.

Around the turn of the century, scholastic honor organizations appeared on grounds. The university chapter of Phi Beta Kappa (ΠΒΚ) was founded in 1908, promoting scholarship in all fields of study. Different schools had specific honor and professional societies as well: Phi Delta Phi (ΦΔΦ) for the law department, Phi Rho Sigma (ΦΡΣ) for medicine, Kappa Delta Mu for chemistry, and many others. A chapter of Theta Tau (ΘΤ), an engineering society, was founded in 1923, and Trigon Engineering Society was founded in 1924 as a local fraternity for engineering students. Trigon and Theta Tau dominated student government in the Engineering School during this time, often fielding competing candidates for student office. Likewise in the College, the University Party and the Cavalier Party were dominated by Lambda Pi and Skull & Keys.

It was during the first half of the twentieth century that the first women's fraternities were established. The university first admitted women to graduate programs in 1920, although undergraduate women were not allowed at the university until much later. With these graduate women came several organizations for women, referred to alternately as sororities or women's fraternities. The first sorority to establish a chapter at the university was Chi Omega (ΧΩ), whose chapter was founded in 1927. A Kappa Delta (ΚΔ) chapter followed in 1932, and a chapter of Zeta Tau Alpha (ΖΤΑ) was established twenty years later in 1952.

In 1947, with the inauguration of Colgate Darden as president of the university, first-year students were prohibited from joining fraternities and sororities. This restriction was later eased to a one-semester prohibition, which is still in place today. During this time only 20 percent of students were members of the 24 fraternities on grounds.  Darden was critical of the fraternities' behavior, arguing in a 1949 report to the Board of Visitors that the groups had failed to uphold the interests of the university community and to provide the leadership expected of them. Additionally, university leaders condemned the fraternities' treatment of their houses, which were extremely run down. Members would often solicit tens of thousands of dollars of donations from alumni to refurbish houses, only to see the improvements disappear within a few years. Despite the administrators' concerns, this problem was not addressed until 1983, when the university created the Historic Renovation Corporation, or HRC. The HRC, which later became a subsidiary of the UVA Foundation, renovates and manages the properties of a number of fraternity and sorority houses.

Late 1900s

Easters
The 1970s saw great upheaval as fraternities, whose membership had been waning, began to increase in size. In 1973, nearly 45 percent of freshman joined fraternities, the highest percentage in school history, and with this increased membership disruptive behavior increased on campus.  In the 1970s the annual tradition of Easters' parties, which began in the 1800s as formal dances sponsored by the ribbon societies, had evolved into a weekend-long celebration where fraternities would flood Mad Bowl and the surrounding areas, creating huge mud pits for the event. By 1976, it was estimated that 15,000 people had come from up and down the East Coast to fill the Mad Bowl. Students washing off mud led to clogged drainage systems in the university, and entire dorms were flooded. Eventually the event became so unmanageable that, in 1982, the university terminated Easters.

African Americans
African Americans were originally admitted to the university in the mid-1950s, but few attended until the 1970s; fraternities at this time were generally racially and religiously segregated. Although a student fraternity committee emphasized the fraternities' rejection of racial discrimination, in 1969 only 5 of 578 fraternity pledges were black. African-American fraternities and sororities soon established chapters at the university, although they presented themselves as service organizations rather than traditional social organizations. In the mid-1970s, although some black students were invited to join the heavily white fraternities, many preferred to join their own organizations. By the fall of 1973, four black fraternities, the Lambda Zeta chapter of Omega Psi Phi (ΩΨΦ), the Eta Sigma chapter of Kappa Alpha Psi (ΚΑΨ), the Iota Beta chapter of Alpha Phi Alpha (ΑΦΑ), and the Zeta Eta chapter of Phi Beta Sigma (ΦΒΣ), and one black sorority, Kappa Rho (ΚΡ) chapter of Delta Sigma Theta (ΔΖΘ), had established chapters on grounds.

Women's organizations
In 1970 the College of Arts and Sciences allowed the first women to enroll in its undergraduate programs, which effectively made the university coeducational. This led to the rapid establishment of many social sororities at the university, and by the end of the 1970s there were eleven sorority chapters at the university, with still more chartered in the 1980s.

In 1975 the sororities established the Inter-Sorority Council, or ISC, to govern the increasing number of sororities on grounds. The ISC was founded to continue the tradition of student self-governance, and was similar to the university's Inter-Fraternity Council (IFC) in its function. The organization was named the Inter-Sorority Council to mimic the name of the Inter-Fraternity Council, which fraternities had established in 1934; this was meant to emphasize sorority women's equality with fraternity men.  Later, in 2005, the ISC voted to formally associate with the National Panhellenic Conference, the national governing body of social sororities. Despite this change, the ISC at the university retained its name due to its historical heritage.

2000 onward: The rise of multicultural fraternities
The first decade of the 2000s saw a quick rise in the number of multicultural organizations at UVA.  In 1999, the first Latina and Asian-interest sorority chapters were founded at UVA, Omega Phi Beta (ΩΦΒ) and alpha Kappa Delta Phi (αΚΔΦ), respectively.  The university's first Latino fraternity, a chapter of Lambda Upsilon Lambda (ΛΥΛ), was founded later that same year. These three organizations founded the Fraternity-Sorority Council, which was meant to organize the newly created multicultural organizations; in 2000, this group was renamed the Multicultural Greek Council, or MGC, and the council exists to this day.
With the creation of additional cultural fraternities and sororities, the MGC has grown to a total of 11 organizations.

In 2002 the IFC decided to admit local fraternities, fraternities that are not affiliated with a national organization, for the first time (although local fraternities had existed at UVA prior to this time, they had not been permitted to join the IFC).  Two years prior, when the Phi Delta Theta (ΦΔΘ) national organization decided to ban alcohol consumption in its chapter houses, the UVA chapter broke away from its national organization and created local organization Phi Delta Alpha, which was later renamed Phi Society. After debate within the IFC, Phi Society was admitted and recognized by the university as a local fraternity. Phi Society is viewed as the continuation of the Phi Delta Theta fraternity that existed prior to 2000 and maintains the same house. In 2001, Phi Delta Theta established another chapter at the university that adheres to its directives concerning alcohol consumption. The Greek system's expansion to new groups continued in 2015, as local fraternity Sigma Omicron Rho became the first gender-inclusive and LGBTQ fraternity to be recognized by the university.

Governance

University recognition 
University policy prevents national fraternities and sororities from directly establishing a chapter at the university; instead, an interested group of students must establish an interest group, petition for establishment, and obtain sponsorship from one of the Greek councils. Once sponsorship is obtained, a group enters the provisional phase of the process; at this point the interest group may contact a national fraternity or sorority to begin the process of establishing themselves as a colony or chapter. Upon successful completion of the provisional phase, the organization is granted full membership in its chosen Greek council.

In order to maintain a formal relationship with the university, each organization must annually complete a Fraternal Organization Agreement (FOA). Fraternal organizations can exist without signing an FOA, however, signing an FOA grants additional benefits to organizations, including the ability to use certain university spaces and to join a Greek council.

Greek councils 
There are several councils at UVA that oversee the functions of their member organizations.  While most fraternal organizations are members of a Greek council, there are several organizations that are independent of these councils, mainly coeducational organizations, professional fraternities, and honor societies. Traditionally, a student is not allowed to join more than one social fraternity or sorority; however, students are normally allowed to join independent fraternities or sororities (mainly professional or honor organizations) in addition to a social fraternity or sorority. The four Greek councils at the University of Virginia are as follows:

The Inter-Fraternity Council, or IFC, is the oldest of the Greek councils. Founded in 1934, the IFC oversees 32 social fraternities and is led by a governing board that is elected by the brothers of the member fraternities. The IFC works with the Presidents' Council, which consists of fraternity chapter presidents, to govern the fraternity community.
The Inter-Sorority Council, or ISC, is the governing body of the majority of UVA's social sororities.  The ISC was founded in 1975, is entirely student-run, and consists of 16 member sororities.
The National Pan-Hellenic Council, or NPHC, was formed to unite the traditionally black organizations on grounds.  The NPHC was originally known as the Black Fraternal Council, which was established in 1973 by the charter of Omega Psi Phi fraternity. In 2005, the BFC was renamed the National Pan-Hellenic Council. These member organizations include 7 total all-male fraternities and all-female sororities. UVA's NPHC is not to be confused with the National Panhellenic Conference, which is the national governing body of social sororities.
The Multicultural Greek Council, or MGC, is the youngest of the Greek councils and comprises the multicultural Greek organizations on grounds.  Founded in 1999, the MGC is composed of 11 total single-sex and coeducational organizations. Each of these organizations emphasizes a particular race or culture, particularly Asian or Latino culture; however, while these organizations may have a certain cultural emphasis, membership is generally open to students of any race.

Controversies

Rolling Stone article
In 2014 the University of Virginia fraternity and sorority system became the focus of significant national scrutiny due to the publication of an article in the December 2014 issue of Rolling Stone magazine, entitled "A Rape on Campus" and authored by Sabrina Erdely. The article alleged that in September 2012, a group of male fraternity members at the university had attacked and raped a female student as part of an initiation rite at a party at the university's chapter of Phi Kappa Psi. The article further asserted that the university's sexual assault policies were severely lacking and that the university administration did not handle sexual assault cases appropriately. The article attracted significant media attention and made national headlines, leading to the suspension of the university's Greek system and further investigation into the article's claims; these investigations quickly revealed numerous inconsistencies and raised serious questions about the article's veracity. On January 12, 2015, Charlottesville Police Department officials told the university that "their investigation has not revealed any substantive basis to confirm that the allegations raised in the Rolling Stone article occurred at Phi Kappa Psi...so there's no reason to keep them suspended". On January 30, 2015, UVA President Teresa Sullivan acknowledged that the Rolling Stone story was discredited. Charlottesville Police officially suspended their four-month investigation on March 23, 2015, stating that they had no evidence of a gang rape taking place, and that "there is no substantive basis to support the account alleged in the Rolling Stone article." On April 5, 2015, Columbia Journalism Review published a report calling the Rolling Stone article "a failure" and criticizing the magazine's actions. That same day, Rolling Stone officially retracted the article and has since issued multiple apologies for the story.

Social fraternities
The University of Virginia has a large number of social fraternities. This list includes active all-male fraternities and coeducational fraternities that identify themselves primarily as social organizations, as opposed to professional, service, or honor organizations. Several of these fraternities were founded much earlier in the university's history, but went inactive and were reestablished later on. In these cases, the establishment date reflects the date that the fraternity's original charter was granted.

Social sororities
In addition to social fraternities, the University of Virginia has a large number of social sororities. This list includes active all-female sororities that identify themselves primarily as social organizations, as opposed to professional, service, or honor organizations. All-female Greek organizations that refer to themselves as "women's fraternities" are included in this list as well.

Service fraternities, professional fraternities and honor societies
The University of Virginia also has chapters of numerous Greek organizations whose primary focus is not social, although some offer social events in addition to service or academic events. While membership in professional fraternities is generally open to any student studying that profession, membership requirements for honor societies are often more demanding and require specific academic or extracurricular achievements.

Service fraternities

Professional fraternities

Honor societies

Defunct and inactive organizations
A number of organizations have historically existed at the university, but are not currently active. Some of these chapters still have extant national organizations, but the University of Virginia chapter is inactive; others were local fraternities that are no longer in existence; still others are no longer active because their entire national organization became extinct. They are listed below:

Fraternities

Sororities
Alpha Xi Delta (ΑΞΔ)
Phi Mu (ΦΜ)
Alpha Omicron Pi (ΑΟΠ)

See also
Rugby Road
Secret societies at the University of Virginia
History of the University of Virginia
Fraternities and sororities in North America
List of social fraternities and sororities
Professional fraternities and sororities
Service fraternities and sororities

References

External links
 University of Virginia website
 University of Virginia IFC website
 University of Virginia ISC website
 University of Virginia NPHC website
 University of Virginia MGC website
 University of Virginia Department of Fraternity and Sorority Life
A history of Greek housing and architecture, by the UVA School of Architecture

Virginia
University of Virginia